Ten-pin bowling at the 2018 Asian Para Games in Jakarta took place between 8 and 11 October 2018.

Medal table

Medalists

Men

Women

Mixed

See also
Bowling at the 2018 Asian Games

References

External links
 Tenpin Bowling - Asian Para Games 2018
 RESULT SYSTEM - ASIAN PARA GAMES JAKARTA 2018

2018 Asian Para Games events
Bowling at multi-sport events
Bowling at the Asian Para Games